The 1922 United States Senate election in Wisconsin was held on November 7, 1922.

Incumbent Republican U.S. Senator Robert M. La Follette was re-elected to a fourth term in office over Democrat Jessie Jack Hooper. Off the strength of his landslide victory, La Follette launched a second campaign for President of the United States in 1924.

La Follette's opponent, the suffragette Jessie Jack Hooper, was among the first American women to ever run a campaign for the U.S. Senate.

Republican primary

Candidates
 William A. Garfield
Robert M. La Follette, incumbent Senator since 1906

Campaign
La Follette spent much of the primary defending his opposition to American involvement in World War I and the Treaty of Versailles. He attacked President Warren Harding's administration and its proposed Four-Power Treaty as equally objectionable as the Versailles negotiations.

Results

Democratic primary

Candidates
 Jessie Jack Hooper, suffragette and anti-war activist

Results

Prohibition primary

Candidates
 Adolph R. Bucknam

Results

General election

Candidates
 Adolph R. Bucknam (Prohibition)
 Jessie Jack Hooper, suffragette and anti-war activist (Democratic)
 Robert M. La Follette, incumbent Senator since 1906 (Republican)
 Richard Koeppel (Socialist Labor)

Campaign
Hooper's campaign was run by two women, Livia Peshkova and Gertrude Watkins, bolstered by women in the press, and often hosted in family living rooms. The campaign rallying cry was "Whoop for Hooper." Her election platform championed the League of Nations, veterans compensation, and world peace.  Her husband was one of only two men who donated any money to her campaign.

Results

See also 
 1922 United States Senate elections

References 

1922
Wisconsin
United States Senate